Giurgiu is a county (județ) of Romania on the border with Bulgaria, in Muntenia, with the capital city at Giurgiu.

Demographics 

 Romanians – over 96%
 Romani – 3.5%
 Others – 0.5%

Geography 

The county is situated on a plain – the Southern part of the Wallachian Plain. The landscape is flat, crossed by small rivers. The southern part is the valley of the Danube which forms the border with Bulgaria. In the North, the Argeș River and Dâmbovița River flow.

Neighbours 

 Călărași County in the East.
 Teleorman County in the West.
 Ilfov County and Dâmbovița County in the North.
 Bulgaria in the South – Ruse Province and Silistra Province.

Economy 
The county has two big areas of development: one close to the city of Giurgiu – The Free Trade Zone Giurgiu, and one in the North of the county due to its proximity with Bucharest.

The predominant industries in the county are:
 Food and beverages industry.
 Textile industry.
 Chemical industry.
 Wood and furniture industry.
 Mechanical components industry.

Agriculture is the main occupation in the county. Both extensive agriculture, and small scale (for Bucharest markets), is practiced. 59% of the cultivated surface is irrigated.

Tourism 
The county recently became famous for its lăutari, especially the group Taraful Haiducilor.

The main tourist destinations are:

The city of Giurgiu 
Here the tourists can visit:

 The Clock Tower, made by the Turks when the Giurgiu was a raya
 The Historical Museum
 The theatre "Valah"
 The first bridge built in angel from Europe, over the Canalul Sfântul Gheorghe and Canalul Plantelor, with a specific construction over 100 years old; near this bridge is a new one from 2007
 The Friendship Bridge over the Danube between Giurgiu and Ruse, Bulgaria
 The churches painted by important painters like Grigorescu
 The fluvial station on the Danube river "Port Giurgiu"
 The street "Strada Gării" filled with markets
 The beautiful parks from town where many statues and fountains can be found
 Fishing along the Danube
 The Călugăreni area
 The monasteries from Giurgiu and Comana

Politics
The Giurgiu County Council, renewed at the 2020 local elections, consists of 30 counsellors, with the following party composition:

Administrative divisions 

Giurgiu County has 1 municipality, 2 towns, and 51 communes:
Municipalities
Giurgiu – capital city; population: 54,655 (as of 2011)
Towns
Bolintin-Vale
Mihăilești

Communes
Adunații-Copăceni
Băneasa
Bolintin-Deal
Bucșani
Bulbucata
Buturugeni
Călugăreni
Clejani
Colibași
Comana
Cosoba
Crevedia Mare
Daia
Florești-Stoenești
Frătești
Găiseni
Găujani
Ghimpați
Gogoșari
Gostinari
Gostinu
Grădinari
Greaca
Herăşti
Hotarele
Iepurești
Isvoarele
Izvoarele
Joița
Letca Nouă
Malu
Mârșa
Mihai Bravu
Ogrezeni
Oinacu
Prundu
Putineiu
Răsuceni
Roata de Jos
Săbăreni
Schitu
Singureni
Slobozia
Stănești
Stoenești
Toporu
Ulmi
Valea Dragului
Vânătorii Mici
Vărăști
Vedea

References

External links

 
Counties of Romania
Geography of Wallachia
1981 establishments in Romania
States and territories established in 1981